The Camoruco railway terminus (Spanish: Estación Camoruco del Ferrocarril) in Valencia, Venezuela, is a rare survival of a 19th century railway station in the South America country. 
The building is also known as the Rectorado of the University of Carabobo. When the Puerto Cabello and Valencia railway closed in the 1950s, the station was transferred to the University of Carabobo which converted it for administrative use.

Location
Camoruco is a suburb of Valencia 3 km from the city centre. While the railway line was in operation, there was a tram service from the station to the Plaza Bolivar in the centre. Initially the trams were horse-drawn, but were powered by electricity from some point in the 20th century.

Architecture
The building respects Spanish Colonial tradition, although
the structure was advanced for its time in making use of cast iron imported from England, Traditional materials were also used.

History
Guzman Blanco, the president of Venezuela, gave a concession to a British company to build a railway between Valencia and the Caribbean coast at Puerto Cabello. The 55 km route of the Puerto Cabello and Valencia railway crossed a range of mountains. The railway was inaugurated in 1888. 
The railway was known locally as the English railway, distinguishing it from the Great Venezuela Railway, a slightly later German-built line. However, the Puerto Cabello Valencia line was not the only British-built railway in the country, and the La Guaira and Caracas Railway was also known as the English railway. 

The right to construct and to operate the railway was to be an exclusive one for ninety-nine years from the date of its completion. However, rail transport in Venezuela became neglected. It went into a major decline from the 1950s, with road transport taking its place.

Revival of rail
In the 21st century a metro system opened in Valencia as a north-south route passing near the old terminus. One of the stations is called Francisco de Mirando (Rectorado). The metro system is planned to connect to a new railway line to the coast at an interchange in Naguanagua Municipality.

Notes

References

Buildings and structures in Valencia, Venezuela
Cast-iron architecture in Venezuela
Defunct railway stations in Venezuela
Railway stations opened in 1888
Repurposed railway stations in the Americas